The Central Wales Football League (formerly the Mid Wales Football League) is a football league in Wales at tier 4 of the Welsh Football pyramid, run by the Central Wales Football Association. The league consists of two regionally based divisions - a North Division and a South Division. The league offers a promotion route to the Football Association of Wales administered Tier 3 Ardal Leagues. Relegation is possible to the relevant tier 5 level leagues in Aberystwyth, Ceredigion, Mid Wales South and Powys.

History
Until the end of the 2019–20 season the league sat at tier 3 and tier 4 of the pyramid, with the tier 3 Division One offering promotion to the Cymru North.

Changes from the 2020–21 season
For the 2020–21 season, the league existed at tier 4 of the Welsh football league system and was called the Mid Wales League, with an east and a west division. The east division was known as the Mid Wales League East. The geographical area of the east division shall be a combination of those parts of the area presently served by the Montgomeryshire League and the Mid Wales South League. The west division was known as the Mid Wales League West. The geographical area of the west division was a combination of those parts of the area presently served by the Aberystwyth League and the Ceredigion League. Each division shall have no more than 16 clubs.

Changes from the 2022–23 season
The Mid Wales Central League will from this season onwards be divided between north and south in a bid to increase membership after the inaugural western league ran with only seven clubs for the 2021–22 season, as was renamed the Central Wales Football League.

Member clubs for 2022–23 season

Northern Division

Abermule
Barmouth & Dyffryn United
Berriew
Bishops Castle Town 
Carno
Churchstoke (resigned July 2022)
Dyffryn Banw
Forden United
Four Crosses 
Kerry 
Llanfyllin Town
Llansantffraid Village
Meifod 
Montgomery Town
Trewern United
Tywyn Bryncrug
Waterloo Rovers

Southern Division

Aberaeron
Aberystwyth University
Brecon Northcote (resigned July 2022)
Hay St Marys
Knighton Town 
Llanilar 
Machynlleth 
Newcastle Emlyn (resigned July 2022)
Penparcau 
Penybont United 
Presteigne St Andrews
Radnor Valley
Talgarth Town
Tregaron Turfs

Division One champions
Information sourced from the Welsh Football Statistician unless otherwise specified.

1890s

1900s

1900-01: – Llandrindod Wells
1901-02: – Knighton Town
1902-03: – Knighton Town
1903-04: – Knighton Town
1904-05: – 
1905-06: – 
1906-07: – 
1907-08: – 
1908-09: – Llandrindod
1909-10: –

1910s

1910-11: – 
1911-12: – 
1912-13: – 
1913-14: – 
1914-15: – League suspended - First World War
1915-16: – League suspended - First World War
1916-17: – League suspended - First World War
1917-18: – League suspended - First World War
1918-19: – League suspended - First World War
1919-20: – Builth

1920s

1920-21: – Talgarth
1921-22: – 
1922-23: – Rhayader & Llandrindod Wells (shared) 
1923-24: – Howey & Llanfaes (shared)  
1924-25: – Rhayader
1925-26: – Aberystwyth Town 
1926-27: – Aberystwyth Town 
1927-28: – Aberystwyth Town 
1928-29: – Llandrindod Town
1929-30: – Aberystwyth Town

1930s

1930-31:
North: Llanidloes
South: Llanidloes
1931-32: – Llanidloes Town
1932-33: – Aberystwyth Town 
1933-34: – Llanidloes Town
1934-35: – Shrewsbury Town reserves
1935-36: – Shrewsbury Town reserves
1936-37: – Aberdovey
1937-38: – Season collapsed
1938-39:
North: Llanidloes
South: Llanidloes 
1939-40: – League suspended - Second World War

1940s

1940-41: – League suspended - Second World War
1941-42: – League suspended - Second World War
1942-43: – League suspended - Second World War
1943-44: – League suspended - Second World War
1944-45: – League suspended - Second World War
1945-46:
Northern: Newtown Military
Southern: Builth
1946-47: – Llanidloes Town
1947-48:
Northern: Llanfyllin Town
Southern: Brecon Corries 
1948-49:
Northern: Aberystwyth Town
Southern: 
1949-50:
Northern: Aberystwyth Town
Southern:

1950s

1950-51: – Llanidloes Town
1951-52: – 55th Royal Artillery Tonfannau
1952-53: – 55th Royal Artillery Tonfannau
1953-54: – 55th Royal Artillery Tonfannau
1954-55: – Kington Town
1955-56: – 55th Royal Artillery Tonfannau
1956-57: – 55th Royal Artillery Tonfannau
1957-58: – 55th Royal Artillery Tonfannau
1958-59: – Aberystwyth Town reserves
1959-60: – Caersws

1960s

1960-61: – Caersws
1961-62: – Llandrindod Wells
1962-63: – Caersws
1963-64: – Kington Town
1964-65: – Berriew
1965-66: – Kington Town
1966-67: – Llandrindod Wells
1967-68: – Welshpool
1968-69: – Welshpool
1969-70: – Barmouth & Dyffryn United

1970s

1970-71: – Welshpool
1971-72: – Llanidloes Town
1972-73: – Welshpool
1973-74: – Llanidloes Town
1974-75: – Welshpool
1975-76: – Newtown
1976-77: – Welshpool
1977-78: – Caersws
1978-79: – Newtown
1979-80: – Welshpool

1980s

1980-81: – Llanidloes Town
1981-82: – Newtown
1982-83: – Caersws
1983-84: – Aberystwyth Town 
1984-85: – Aberystwyth Town 
1985-86: – Caersws
1986-87: – Newtown
1987-88: – Newtown
1988-89: – Caersws
1989-90: – Caersws

1990s

1990-91: – Morda United
1991-92: – Knighton Town 
1992-93: – Machynlleth
1993-94: – Machynlleth
1994-95: – Machynlleth
1995-96: – Newtown reserves
1996-97: – Caersws reserves
1997-98: – Kerry
1998-99: – Kerry
1999-2000: – Carno

2000s

2000-01: – Season abandoned after outbreak of Foot and mouth disease
2001-02: – Penrhyncoch
2002-03: – Penrhyncoch
2003-04: – Aberystwyth Town reserves
2004-05: – Aberystwyth Town reserves
2005-06: – Llanrhaeadr-ym-Mochnant
2006-07: – Presteigne St Andrews   
2007-08: – Aberystwyth Town reserves 
2008-09: – Newtown reserves
2009-10: – Penparcau

2010s

2010-11: – Llanrhaeadr-ym-Mochnant
2011-12: – Rhayader Town
2012-13: – Llanidloes Town
2013-14: – Llandrindod Wells
2014-15: – Llanfair United
2015-16: – Penrhyncoch
2016-17: – Rhayader Town
2017-18: – Llanrhaeadr-ym-Mochnant
2018-19: – Llanfair United
2019-20: – Llanidloes Town

2020s

2020-21:
East Division: – Season cancelled
West Division: – Season cancelled
2021-22:
East Division: – Brecon Corries 
West Division: – Tywyn Bryncrug
2022-23:
North Division: – 
South Division: –

Number of titles since 1950

Caersws/ reserves – 9 
Newtown/ reserves   – 7 
Welshpool – 7 
55th Royal Artillery Tonfannau – 6 
Aberystwyth Town reserves – 6 
Llanidloes Town – 6 
Knighton Town  – 4 
Llandrindod Wells – 3 
Llanrhaeadr-ym-Mochnant – 3 
Machynlleth – 3 
Penrhyncoch – 3 
Brecon Corries – 2
Kerry – 2 
Kington Town – 2 
Llanfair United – 2 
Rhayader Town – 2 
Barmouth & Dyffryn United – 1 
Berriew – 1 
Carno– 1 
Morda United – 1
Penparcau– 1 
Presteigne St Andrews – 1
Tywyn Bryncrug – 1

See also
Football in Wales
Welsh football league system
Welsh Cup
Welsh League Cup
FAW Premier Cup
List of football clubs in Wales
List of stadiums in Wales by capacity

References

External links
Results from every season

Mid Wales Football League
Wales
Sports leagues established in 1900
1900 establishments in Wales